Thomas Burgess (ca. 1540 – 13 August 1623), of Truro in Cornwall, was an English merchant, and was Mayor of Truro in 1589 and an alderman of the town at the time its coat of arms was confirmed in 1620. He was Member of Parliament for Truro in the Parliament of 1604–1611.

References

 
 Vivian's Visitations of Cornwall (Exeter: William Pollard & Co, 1887) 

1540s births
1623 deaths
Year of birth uncertain
Members of the pre-1707 English Parliament for constituencies in Cornwall
English merchants
People from Truro
16th-century English businesspeople
16th-century merchants
17th-century merchants
English MPs 1604–1611
Mayors of places in Cornwall
17th-century English businesspeople